Brachyotum ledifolium, also known as pucachaglla, is a plant of the genus Brachyotum that grows in the lower elevations of the Andean Páramo. Its fruits are edible.

References

ledifolium
Páramo flora